Waddle–Click Farm is a historic home and farm complex located near Statesville, Iredell County, North Carolina.  The Federal style house was built between about 1820 and 1835, and is a two-story, three bay by two bay, log dwelling.  Also on the property are a contributing well house, smokehouse, log slave cabin, granary / corn crib, hay barn / stable, and a shed.

It was added to the National Register of Historic Places in 1982.

References

Farms on the National Register of Historic Places in North Carolina
Federal architecture in North Carolina
Houses completed in 1835
Houses in Iredell County, North Carolina
National Register of Historic Places in Iredell County, North Carolina
Slave cabins and quarters in the United States